Adam John Neu was born in German Township, Vanderburgh County, Indiana just northwest of Evansville to Adam Neu and Katherine Reisinger Neu. Although he shared the same first name with his father there is no documentation to indicate he was a junior.  The elder Adam Neu was the first generation born in the United States with his father Heinrich Neu born in Baden, Germany in 1811. Adam John's older brother Fred died at age 24 when Adam was only six years old, his father died two years later.  After the death of his father Adam lived with his mother in a modest home on St. Joseph Avenue on the west side of Evansville.  Adam entered the army in 1915 where he learned baking as a trade and was assigned to the Philippine Islands where he advanced to rank of technical sergeant in charge of baking operations.

After Adam left the army in 1920 he worked for the Max Weinberg Bakery for two years while he saved money to start his own business.  In 1922 Adam started the Lincoln Bakery which was located at 121 ½ Lincoln Ave for a few years before moving to a larger facility at 1515 Park St.  Adam would bake loaves of bread that were delivered by school age boys with push carts.  After he married the former Georgia Heil in 1923, Adam began baking cakes at home during his down time and she would ice and decorate them.  It wasn't long before delivery expanded first to a horse-drawn carriage and then to a fleet of trucks.  The delivery area covered much of Southern Indiana, Illinois and Northern Kentucky.  By 1949 the company grew to 150 employees and was a franchise baker for Sunbeam Bread.   Claims that Adam had the idea to create the Little Miss Sunbeam mascot are not able to be confirmed, however he did develop safety signs using the familiar character urging motorists to drive safely and watch out for children.  

Adam had always been active in the health and education of young people and was a member of the board of directors of the University of Evansville (then Evansville College) since 1952. Adam also served as a trustee of the college.  In 1964 he donated $350,000 for construction of Neu Chapel at the University of Evansville.

Adam was associated with several civic organizations including the Masons, Scottish Rite, Shrine, Elks, and Kiwanis.  In 1950 he headed the Hadi Shrine Circus Committee for the annual event in Evansville.  In 1952 he was cited by the national Shrine organization for his work on behalf of crippled children.  And then in 1952 Adam was elected potentate of the Hadi Temple Shrine and installed on February 2 of that year.  He said that his program was to expand Hadi Temple's activity and extend Shrine hospital services to more children in Evansville.

Other groups he supported were Community Chest, Red Cross, Member of Board of Trustees, Crippled Children's Hospital, St. Louis.  He was also on the board of directors for Deaconess Hospital in Evansville.

In August 1956 he was part of the “Hi Neighbor” tour with 75 other Evansville men who toured communities in neighboring states to cultivate friendly relations.

While Adam and Georgia Neu were generous philanthropists they were also known to be publicity shy. Neighbor and longtime friend Milton Humphrey said of them “They did a lot of things for this city (Evansville, Indiana) that people didn't know about. Evansville is better off for them having lived here.”

References

People from Vanderburgh County, Indiana
American bakers
United States Army soldiers
University of Evansville people